Unidos Por La Cruz, recorded live in the city of Juárez, Chihuahua, México, is the first praise and worship album record by Jesus Adrian Romero. Songs like "Sumérgeme" and "Sentado En Su Trono" have become very popular among Hispanic Christian congregations.

Track listing
"Con Mi Dios" - 04:04 - Jesús Adrián Romero
"De Hombro A Hombro" - 03:05 -
"Has Aumentado" - 03:22 -  Emmanuel Espinosa & Jesús Adrián Romero
"Al Que Me Ciñe" - 03:27 - Pastor Ricardo Merina
"Él Es El Rey" - 03:45 - Emmanuel Espinosa & Jesús Adrián Romero
"Hombre De Compromiso" - 04:23 - Jesús Adrián Romero
"Yo Me Rindo A Él" - 04:31 - Van DeVenter; Weeden, 1896.
"Sumérgeme" - 05:11 - Jesús Adrián Romero
"Hacemos Hoy" - 04:44 - Jesús Adrián Romero
"Sentado En Su Trono" - 06:04 - Jesús Adrián Romero

Personnel
Executive producer - Chris Richards (Hombre a Hombre Ministries)
Produced, recorded & mixed by Luis Chi Sing 
Assisted by Ricardo de Anda
Mastered by Doug Doyle in Digital Brothers, Costa Mesa, Ca.
Musical arrangements - Herb Jimmenson
Jesús Adrián Romero - Worship leader
Herb Jimmenson - Piano in "Al que me ciñe", "Yo me rindo a Él", "Sumérgeme", "Hacemos hoy", & Sentado en su trono".
Mike Rodríguez - Piano in "Con mi Dios", "De hombro a hombro", "Has aumentado", "Él es el Rey", & "Hombres de compromiso".
Juan Castillo - Drums
Carlos Serrat - Bass
Jaime Félix - Guitar
Herb Jimmenson - Additional keyboards
Backup vocalists - Rubén Huesca Esquivel, Rubén Huesca Ortiz, José Alvarado, Sergio Nevárez, Oscar Iñarritú, Anselmo Sosa, Alberto Grimaldo, Gabriel Vázquez, Fernando Ríos, Luis Rivera, Carlos Arzola, Joel Reyes, Alex Castillo, Naty & Michel Blanco.

External links

1996 live albums
Jesús Adrián Romero albums
Live gospel albums